Sobradinho may refer to:

 Sobradinho, Bahia, a municipality in Bahia, Brazil
 Sobradinho Reservoir, a reservoir located in the municipality
 Sobradinho Dam, a hydroelectric dam damming the reservoir
 Sobradinho, Federal District, an administrative region in the Federal District of Brazil
 Sobradinho Esporte Clube, Sobradinho's football club
 Sobradinho, Rio Grande do Sul, a municipality in Rio Grande do Sul, Brazil